Rita Lakin (born January 24, 1930) is an American screenwriter, active from around 1962 to 1981.  She has credits for 474 produced television scripts spanning 30 productions.  She is also a novelist and author of "The Only Woman In The Room," a memoir of her life as one of the first female show runners and one of the first women in television (released October 2015, Applause publishing).  In fiction, Lakin created the Gladdy Gold Mystery seven-book series (published by Bantam Books), including Getting Old Is Murder, Getting Old Is The Best Revenge, and Getting Old Can Kill You.

Lakin began writing regularly during the early 1960s for such television shows as The Doctors, Dr. Kildare and Peyton Place. In 1968, she began working as story editor and head writer of The Mod Squad. In 1972, she created The Rookies. In 1977, she served as executive producer of the CBS TV adaptation of the 1954 film Executive Suite. She wrote numerous "Movies of the Week" including Women in Chains, and such miniseries as Strong Medicine and Voices of the Heart. In 1981, she developed the TV series adaptation and served as show-runner of Flamingo Road. In 1989, she co-created the medical drama Nightingales. She also wrote or co-authored two original theatrical plays, No Language But a Cry and Saturday Night at Grossinger's.

Awards
Rita Lakin has won nominations and awards for her writing including the Writers Guild of America Award, the Edgar Allan Poe Award and the Avery Hopwood Award from the University of Michigan.

Books

Television
Rita Lakin has written 464 episodes, eight movies of the week, and two miniseries, spanning 30 television productions. She is also the creator of the crime drama series The Rookies and the prime time soap Flamingo Road, and co-creator with Howard Lakin and Frank Furino of the US medical drama Nightingales produced by Aaron Spelling.

References

External links
 
 The Rita Lakin papers at the American Heritage Center

20th-century American dramatists and playwrights
American mystery writers
American soap opera writers
1930 births
Living people
University of Michigan alumni
Place of birth missing (living people)
20th-century American novelists
21st-century American novelists
American women novelists
Women mystery writers
20th-century American women writers
American women television writers
Hopwood Award winners
Women soap opera writers
21st-century American women writers